The 1969 UC Riverside Highlanders football team represented the University of California, Riverside as a member of the California Collegiate Athletic Association (CCAA) during the 1969 NCAA College Division football season. Led by Pete Kettela in his fifth and final season as head coach, UC Riverside compiled an overall record of 3–6 with a mark of record of 0–1 in conference play, placing last out of four teams in the CCAA. The team was outscored by its opponents 203 to 163 for the season. The Highlanders played home games at Highlander Stadium in Riverside, California.

CCAA football changed significantly in 1969. Three teams—Fresno State, Long Beach State, and Cal State Los Angeles—left the conference and moved up to NCAA University Division competition, joining in the newly-formed Pacific Coast Athletic Association. They were replaced by Cal Poly Pomona and UC Riverside.

Kettela finished his tenure at UC Riverside with an overall record of 24–20–2, for a .543 winning percentage.

Schedule

References

UC Riverside
UC Riverside Highlanders football seasons
UC Riverside Highlanders football